Alec Seward (born Alexander T. Seward, March 16, 1901 – May 11, 1972) was an American Piedmont blues and country blues singer, guitarist and songwriter. Some of his records were released under pseudonyms, such as Guitar Slim, Blues Servant Boy, King Blues and Georgia Slim. His best-remembered recordings are "Creepin' Blues" and "Some People Say".

Biography
Seward, one of fourteen siblings, was born in Charles City County, Virginia. Like Gabriel Brown, Ralph Willis and Brownie McGhee, he relocated from the South to New York, in his case in 1924.

Seward befriended Brownie McGhee and Sonny Terry and retained his Piedmont blues styling despite changes in musical trends. He and the blues musician Louis Hayes (who later became a minister in northern New Jersey) performed together, variously billed as the Blues Servant Boys, Guitar Slim and Jelly Belly, and the Back Porch Boys. During the 1940s and 1950s Seward played and recorded with Lead Belly, Woody Guthrie, McGhee and Terry. Around 1947 Seward, Guthrie, and Terry recorded several chain gang songs, including "Chain Gang Special", and some other older songs adapted to having chain gang themes. They were later released on the compilation album Best of the War Years.

Under his own name, Seward issued Creepin' Blues (1965, Bluesville), with harmonica accompaniment by Larry Johnson. Later in the decade Seward worked in concert and at folk blues festivals.

Seward died of natural causes in May 1972, at the age of 71, in New York City.

He is not to be confused with Eddie "Guitar Slim" Jones, Guitar Slim, Jr., James "Guitar Slim" Stephenson or Norman "Guitar Slim" Green.

Selected discography
Creepin' Blues (1965, Bluesville)
Late One Saturday Evening (1996, Blues Alliance)
The Back Porch Boys (2002, Delmark)

See also
East Coast blues
List of country blues musicians

References

1901 births
1972 deaths
American blues guitarists
American male guitarists
American blues singers
Songwriters from Virginia
Country blues musicians
Singers from Virginia
Piedmont blues musicians
20th-century American singers
20th-century American guitarists
Guitarists from Virginia
20th-century American male singers
American male songwriters